The 1993 Canada Cup was a women's rugby union international competition that took place at grounds in Ajax, Brampton and Toronto in Ontario and featured England, the United States and Wales along with the hosts. The tournament was won by England.  1993 was the first edition of the Canada Cup.

Final table

Results

Round 1

Round 2

Round 3

See also
Women's international rugby union - includes all women's international match results
Churchill Cup

1993 rugby union tournaments for national teams
1993
1993 in Canadian rugby union
1993 in American rugby union
1992–93 in Welsh rugby union
1992–93 in English rugby union
1993 in women's rugby union
1993 in American women's sports
1993 in English women's sport